The Luang Prabang Stadium or Luang Prabang regional stadium is a multi-purpose stadium in Luang Prabang, Laos. It is used mostly for football matches, Lao League 1 but also for athletics, ceremonies and concerts. It is also the stadium that is used for the Luang Prabang Games. The Luang Prabang stadium holds 20,000 people. It has pink, yellow and blue tribunes, a small roof above the main tribune and a running track around the field.

Buildings and structures in Luang Prabang
Football venues in Laos